Kings Peak is a mountain in Benewah County, Idaho, United States and is about  southwest of the town of St. Maries.

References 

Mountains of Benewah County, Idaho
Mountains of Idaho